John David Lewis (February 14, 1884 – February 25, 1956) was a second baseman in Major League Baseball, playing in the American League with the Boston Red Sox (1911) and for the Pittsburgh Rebels of the "outlaw" Federal League (1914–15). He was born in Pittsburgh, Pennsylvania.

In a three-season career, Lewis was a .247 hitter (169-for-684) with one home run and 80 RBI in 217 games, including 63 runs, 20 doubles, 10 triples and 18 stolen bases. In 200 fielding appearances, he played at second base (172), shortstop (12), right field (6), first base (5) and third base (1). He committed 51 errors in 1,068 chances for a collective .952 fielding percentage.

Lewis died in Steubenville, Ohio at age 72.

See also
1911 Boston Red Sox season

External links

Retrosheet

Boston Red Sox players
Pittsburgh Rebels players
Major League Baseball second basemen
Baseball players from Pennsylvania
1884 births
1956 deaths
McKeesport Tubers players
Wheeling Stogies players
St. Paul Saints (AA) players
Milwaukee Brewers (minor league) players
Pittsburgh Filipinos players
Wilkes-Barre Barons (baseball) players
Newark Bears (IL) players
Indianapolis Indians players
Memphis Chickasaws players